Amadu Bukari Sorogho is a Ghanaian politician. He was the member of parliament for the Abokobi-Madina Constituency from 7 January 2005 to 6 January 2013. From 7 January 2013 to 6 January 2017, he was the member of parliament for the Madina Constituency.

Early life and education
Sorogho was born on 5 May 1955. He hails from Bawku, in the Upper East Region of Ghana. He obtained his bachelor of arts in political science from the University of Ghana in 1981 and later proceeded to the Ghana Institute of Management and Public Administration (GIMPA) for his post graduate studies graduating in 1993. He received a certificate in Trade and Finance from the World Bank Institute, Washington in 2009.

Career
Sorogho is a Human Resource Manager and Public Relations Consultant by profession. Prior to entering politics, he was the Human Resource and Public Relations Consultant Manager for Desimone Group Of Companies Limited in Accra.

Politics
Sorogho entered parliament on 7 January 2005 on the ticket of the National Democratic Congress (NDC) representing the Abokobi-Madina Constituency. He represented the constituency from 2005 until 2012 when the constituency was split. From 7 January 2013 until 6 January 2017 he was the member of parliament for the Madina Constituency. He contested for the seat for a second consecutive term but lost to Saddique Boniface Abu-Bakar of the New Patriotic Party during the 2016 Ghanaian general election. In 2018 he contested for the post of National Vice Chairman of the NDC but lost to Said Sinare.

Personal life
Sorogho is married with six children. He identifies as a Muslim.

References

Ghanaian MPs 2005–2009
Ghanaian MPs 2009–2013
Ghanaian MPs 2013–2017
1955 births
Living people
Ghanaian Muslims